Stefan Edberg was the defending champion, but did not participate this year.

John McEnroe won the tournament, beating Anders Järryd in the final, 6–4, 6–1.

Seeds

Draw

Finals

Top half

Bottom half

External links
 Main draw

Milan Indoor
1985 Grand Prix (tennis)
Milan